John George Edward Henry Douglas Sutherland Campbell, 9th Duke of Argyll (6 August 1845 – 2 May 1914), usually better known by the courtesy title Marquess of Lorne, by which he was known between 1847 and 1900, was a British nobleman who was Governor General of Canada from 1878 to 1883. He was the husband of Princess Louise, fourth daughter of Queen Victoria. He was the first president of "Rangers Football Club", thanks to his Argyll ties to the original founders of the football club.

Background and career
Campbell was born in London, the eldest son of George, Marquess of Lorne and the former Lady Elizabeth Sutherland-Leveson-Gower, daughter of the 2nd Duke of Sutherland, and was styled Earl of Campbell from birth. In 1847, when he was 21 months old, his father succeeded as 8th Duke of Argyll and he assumed the courtesy title Marquess of Lorne, which he bore until he was 54. He was educated at Edinburgh Academy, Eton College, St Andrews and at Trinity College, Cambridge, as well as at the National Art Training School.

For ten years before coming to Canada, Lorne travelled throughout North and Central America, writing travel literature and poetry. In the UK, he represented, from 1868, the constituency of Argyllshire as a Liberal Member of Parliament in the House of Commons. He made little impression there, however; the London World referred to Lorne as "a non-entity in the House of Commons, and a non-entity without." A.C. Benson, who edited Queen Victoria's letters and spent time in the company of the royals, gave him the same epithet.

He was appointed Lieutenant-Colonel Commandant of the part-time 1st Argyll and Bute Artillery Volunteers on 13 July 1866. He gave up the position in the 1880s, but was appointed the unit's Honorary Colonel on 18 July 1900.

Lord Lorne married Queen Victoria's fourth daughter, Princess Louise, on 21 March 1871. This was the first time a legitimate daughter of the sovereign had married a subject of the Crown since 1515, when Charles Brandon, the first Duke of Suffolk, married Mary Tudor. The pair shared a common love of the arts, but the marriage was childless and unhappy, and they spent much time apart. Lorne formed close friendships with men, including Lord Ronald Gower, Morton Fullerton and the Count de Mauny, who were known to be homosexual or bisexual, which fuelled rumours in London society that he shared their predisposition. No conclusive evidence has been found to settle this issue either way.

Governor General of Canada

When Lord Lorne's appointment was announced, there was great excitement throughout Canada. For the first time, Rideau Hall would have a royal resident. The Canadian Prime Minister relaxed his busy campaign schedule to prepare for her arrival and to organise a special carriage and corps of guards to protect the Princess. An author wrote in 1880 that "the appointment was hailed with satisfaction in all parts of the Dominion, and the new Governor General entered upon his term of office with the hearts of the people strongly prepossessed  in his favour."

However, Campbell and his wife were initially not received well by the Canadian press, which complained about the imposition of royalty on the country's hitherto un-regal society, a position that was only exasperated by mishaps and misunderstandings. The worries of a rigid court at the Queen's Canadian residence turned out to be unfounded; the couple were more relaxed than their predecessors, as demonstrated at the many ice skating and tobogganing parties, balls, dinners, and other state occasions hosted by the Marquess and Marchioness.

At age 33, Lord Lorne was Canada's youngest governor general and he became the first representative of Queen Victoria to have been born during the latter's reign but he was not too young to handle the marginal demands of his post. He and Princess Louise made many lasting contributions to Canadian society, especially in the arts and sciences. They encouraged the establishment of the Royal Society of Canada, the Royal Canadian Academy of Arts, and the National Gallery of Canada, even selecting some of its first paintings. Campbell was involved in the completion of the Canadian Pacific Railway and other projects, such as a hospital for British Columbia.

Throughout his term of office, Lorne was intensely interested in Canada and Canadians. He travelled throughout the country, encouraging the establishment of numerous institutions, and met with First Nations and other Canadians from all walks of life. At Rideau Hall, he and Princess Louise hosted many social functions, including numerous ice skating and tobogganing parties as well as balls, dinners and state occasions. His small collection of First Nations artefacts was purchased by the British Museum in 1887.

After Canada
Princess Louise returned to England in 1881 and Lord Lorne followed two years later in 1883, when his book, Memories of Canada and Scotland, was published.

In 1907, strenuous efforts were taken by officials to ensure that Lorne's name was not dragged into the investigation of the theft of the Irish Crown Jewels. This was due to the fact that his closest friend was Lord Ronald Gower, who while innocent, was associated with several of the homosexual circle who were involved in it.

Lorne was Governor and Constable of Windsor Castle from 1892 to 1914 and he sat as MP for Manchester South from 1895 until the death of his father on 24 April 1900, when he succeeded as 9th and 2nd Duke of Argyll. He and Princess Louise lived at Kensington Palace until his death from pneumonia in 1914. He is buried at Kilmun Parish Church.

Honours

Orders and decorations
 KG: Knight of the Most Noble Order of the Garter, 1911
 KT: Knight of the Most Ancient and Most Noble Order of the Thistle, 1871
 GCMG: Knight Grand Cross of the Most Distinguished Order of St Michael and St George, 14 September 1878
 GCVO: Knight Grand Cross of the Royal Victorian Order, 2 February 1901
  Knight Grand Cross of the Royal Norwegian Order of Saint Olav, with Collar, 13 November 1906

Civil and military appointments
 PC: Sworn in as a member of Her Majesty's Most Honourable Privy Council, 17 March 1875
 LL.D (honorary), University of Cambridge, May 1902
 Honorary Colonel of the 1st Argyll and Bute Artillery Volunteers, 18 July 1900
 Honorary Colonel of the 5th Volunteer Battalion, Princess Louise's (Argyll and Sutherland Highlanders), 20 September 1902

Places named after him

 Lorne Building, Ottawa, Ontario, Canada 
 Port Lorne, Nova Scotia, Canada
 Lorne, Nova Scotia
 Municipality of Lorne, Manitoba, Canada
 West Elgin, Ontario, Canada
 Lorne, Victoria, Australia
 Lorne Street, Oswestry, Shropshire, UK
 Lorne Avenue, Ottawa, Ontario, Canada
 Lorne Avenue, Trenton, Ontario, Canada
 Lorne Street, Montreal, Quebec, Canada
 Lorne Street, Sudbury, Ontario, Canada
Marquis of Lorne Trail, section of Highway 22X, Calgary, Alberta, Canada
 Lorne Park and Lorne Park Estates, in Mississauga, Ontario (by Sarah Jane Earls, descendant of Sir John Mourach, second Marquis of Lorne)
Rural Municipality of Argyle, Manitoba, Canada
Lorne, New Brunswick

Organizations named after him
 The Lorne Scots (Peel, Dufferin and Halton Regiment), infantry regiment of the Canadian Army.

Ancestors

Notes

References

External links

 
 
 Website of the Governor General of Canada''
 
 
 
 
 
Photograph: Marquis of Lorne, Governor General of Canada in 1879. McCord Museum

1845 births
1914 deaths
Alumni of the University of St Andrews
9
Governors General of Canada
Knights Grand Cross of the Order of St Michael and St George
Knights Grand Cross of the Royal Victorian Order
Knights of the Garter
Knights of the Thistle
Presidents of the Royal Geographical Society
Campbell, John
Campbell, John
Campbell, John
Campbell, John
Lord-Lieutenants of Argyllshire
19th-century Scottish landowners
Campbell, John
Campbell, John
Members of the Privy Council of the United Kingdom
J
20th-century Scottish landowners
19th-century Scottish businesspeople